The Uncle Dave Macon House is a historic house in Readyville, Tennessee, U.S.. It was built as a log cabin in 1843. It was purchased by country music performer Uncle Dave Macon in 1900. He resided there until his death in 1952. It has been listed on the National Register of Historic Places since November 15, 1973.

References

Houses on the National Register of Historic Places in Tennessee
Houses in Rutherford County, Tennessee
Houses completed in 1843